David C. Sampson (born January 26, 1951) is an American contemporary classical composer.

Biography 
Sampson earned a B.A. in music from the Curtis Institute of Music, where he studied trumpet with Gilbert Johnson. He continued his studies with Donald Lybbert in composition at Hunter College, earning an M.F.A. in composition, followed by a D.M.A. at the Manhattan School of Music, where he studied composition with John Corigliano and trumpet with Robert Nagel and Raymond Mase. He also attended the Ecole d’Art Americaines at Fontainebleau as a composition student of Robert Levin.  Additionally, he has studied with Karel Husa and Henri Dutilleux in composition and Gerard Schwarz on trumpet.

Sampson has received major grants from the National Endowment for the Arts, American Academy of Arts and Letters, Chamber Music America, Barlow Endowment, New Jersey State Council on the Arts, Jerome Foundation, Mary Flagler Cary Charitable Trust, and the Geraldine R. Dodge Foundation.

Selected commissioned works
The War Prayer (1984–85) for soloists, chorus, and orchestra. Commissioned by the National Endowment for the Arts and premiered by Princeton Pro Musica.
Hommage JFK (1995) for 14 brass and three percussion. Commissioned by the National Symphony Orchestra.
Monument (1996–97). Commissioned by the Barlow Foundation for the Akron and Memphis Symphony Orchestras.
Turns (1994) for violoncello and orchestra. Commissioned by the Bergen Foundation and cellist Paul Tobias and premiered by the New Jersey Symphony Orchestra.
Triptych (1991) for trumpet and orchestra. Commissioned by the International Trumpet Guild. Premiered by Raymond Mase at the Aspen Music Festival and with the    American Composers Orchestra at Carnegie Hall.
Dectet (1998). Commissioned by the Chicago Chamber Musicians.
Strata (1999). Commissioned by the National Endowment for the Arts and the American Brass Quintet.
Jersey Rain (2001). Commissioned by the NEA and the Geraldine R. Dodge Foundation and premiered by Harmonium and Masterworks Choruses and the Colonial Symphony.
Breathing Lessons (2006) for saxophone quartet. Commissioned by Chamber Music America for the Amherst Saxophone Quartet.
Short Stories (1994). Commissioned by Chamber Music America and the Pew Charitable Trust.
Elements (2002) for string quartet. Commissioned by the Elements String Quartet.
Double Back (2015) for trumpet, trombone, and wind ensemble. Premiered by Rex Richardson, Joseph Alessi, and the VCU Symphonic Wind Ensemble, Terry Austin, director.
Simple Lives (1990). Commissioned by the Colonial Symphony.
Duncan Trio (2002) for brass trio. Commissioned by Dorothy Duncan.
Breakaway (2004) for two trumpets and electronics. Commissioned by Raymond Mase and Kevin Cobb.
Smoky Mountain Fanfare (2010) for brass quintet. Commissioned by the Smoky Mountain Brass Quintet.
Like the Risen Grain (2011) for mixed chorus, brass quintet, timpani, and organ. Commissioned by Bucknell University.
Legend (2011) for wind ensemble. Commissioned by Texas A&M Commerce University.
Still (2013) for brass quintet. Commissioned by the Gaudete Brass Quintet.
Mock Attack! (2014) for clarinet. Commissioned by the Montclair Art Museum.
Memories To Keep Awhile (2014) for trumpet/flugelhorn, violin, violoncello, and piano. Commissioned by David Elton and the Australian Festival of Chamber Music.
Random Acts (2018) for trumpet and piano. Commissioned by a consortium of 15 trumpets players organized by Kevin Cobb.

Discography 

 Monument (Summit Records DCD237), 1999.Triptych, Simple Lives, Hommage JFK, Three Portraits, Monument. Czech Philharmonic Chamber Orchestra, Alan Balter, conductor; Raymond Mase, trumpet;Scott Mendoker, tuba.
 Dectet (Troy 780), 2005. Serenade for flügelhorn and string orchestra, Raymond Mase, flügelhorn; Czech Philharmonic Chamber Orchestra. Sonata Forty for horn and piano, Scott Brubaker, horn; Ron Levy, piano. Strata for brass quintet, The American Brass Quintet. Dectet for string quartet, wind quintet, and piano, Paul Polivnick, conductor, Wihan Quartet; Afflatus Wind Quintet; Richard Ormrod, piano.
 Chesapeake (Summit Records DCD639), 2014. Breakaway for two trumpets and electronics, Raymond Mase, Kevin Cobb, trumpets; Powell Trio for trombone, marimba, and piano, Michael Powell, trombone; She-e Wu, marimba; Steven Beck, piano. Three Sides for trumpet/flügelhorn, vibraphone and piano, Raymond Mase, trumpet/flügelhorn; James Baker, vibraphone; Steven Beck, piano. Just Keep Moving for horn, bass trombone, marimba and piano, David Wakefield, horn;John D. Rojak, bass trombone; She-e Wu, marimba; Martha Locker, piano. Chesapeake for brass quintet, American Brass Quintet.
 Notes from Faraway Places (Summit Records DCD681), 2016. Fanfare for Canterbury Cathedral for double brass quintet, American Brass Quintet; Quo Vadis Brass Quintet. Tenebrae for trumpet and organ, Raymond Mase, trumpet; Trent Johnson, organ. Without Warning for piano, Steven Beck, piano. Mock Attack for solo clarinet, Andy Lamy, clarinet. A Family Portrait for brass quintet, Philadelphia Brass. Evensong for tuba and electronics, Scott Mendoker, tuba. The Death of Macbeth for solo timpani and percussion quartet, James Musto, Tom Murphy, Nancy Pontius, David Stockton, Jeff Willet, percussion. Notes from Faraway Places, Suite 3 for two trumpets, Donald Batchelder, Raymond Mase, trumpets. Smoky Mountain Fanfare for brass quintet, Philadelphia Brass. Changewater for eight trombones, Richard Clark, Richard Harris, Tom Hutchinson, Chris Olness, Michael Powell,  Tim Albright, Kenneth Finn, tenor trombones; John Rojak, bass trombone. Inamere for twelve trumpets.

Recordings featuring compositions by David Sampson 

 American Tribute (Summit Records (DCD 127), 1991. Reflections On A Dance,Summit Brass.
 Divertimento - Music For Winds (Bay Cities BCD1030), 1991. In Memoriam: W.E.S.,Aspen Wind Quintet.                  
 New American Brass (Summit Records, DCD133), 1992. Morning Music, American Brass Quintet.
 Trumpet in Our Time (Summit Records, DCD-148), 1995.The Mysteries Remain, Solo,  Raymond Mase.
 Five (Channel Classics CCS 9496), 1995. Morning Music, Meridian Arts Ensemble.
 Premier! (Summit Records DCD 187),1996. Distant Voices, American Brass Quintet.
 Atemwege - Breath Paths (Bayer-Records, CAD800876), 1999. Solo, Lutz Mandler, flügelhorn.
 A Choral Bouquet (Rutgers - The State University of New Jersey), 1999. Shout For Joy!, Rutgers University Chorus, John Floreen, conductor.
 First Glimpses of Sunlight (Summit Records DCD233), 1999. Short Stories, Dorian Wind Quintet.
 Sing We Merrily (Rutgers - The State University of New Jersey), 2001. Of The Father’s Love Begotten (arr.), Rutgers University Chorus, John Floreen, conductor.
 Raritonality (Mark Masters MCD6199), 2006. Moving Parts, Rutgers Wind Ensemble, William Berz, conductor.
 Stargazer (Equilibrium EQL 83), 2007. Passage, Alan Siebert, trumpet.
 Jewels (Summit Records DCD 484), 2007. Entrance, American Brass Quintet.
 Outberzt (Mark Masters MCD8652), 2009. Outburst, Rutgers Wind Ensemble, William Berz, conductor.                    
 WASABE 2009 (Mark Records MCD8471), 2009. Outburst, North Texas Wind Symphony.
 Archetypes (GIA WindWorks CD-820), 2009. Moving Parts, North Texas Wind Symphony, Eugene Corporon, conductor.
 Brass Trios (Albany Records, Troy 1222), 2010. Duncan Trio, University of Maryland Brass Trio.
 State of the Art:  The ABQ at 50 (Summit Records, DCD 553), 2010. Chants and Flourishes, American Brass Quintet.
 Breathing Lessons: Music for Saxophone Quartet (Naxos 8.559627), 2011. Breathing Lessons, New Hudson Saxophone Quartet.
 Chicago Moves (Cedille Records, CDR 90000), 2012. Chicago Moves.Gaudete Brass. Hi-Fi News album choice, June 2013.
 New American Masters, Volume 5 (Albany Records Troy1481), 2014. Undercurrents Redux,Palisades Virtuosi.
 Sevenfive: The Corigliano Effect (Cedille Records CDR 90000 169), 2017. Entrance, Still,Gaudete Brass.

Compositions by instrumentation

Orchestral

The Notes Fit To Print for orchestra, 1980
Three Portraits for tuba and chamber orchestra, 1990
Simple Lives for orchestra, 1990
Triptych for trumpet and orchestra, 1991
Turns for violoncello and orchestra, 1994
Monument for orchestra, 1996–97
Serenade for flügelhorn and string orchestra, 1998
Jersey Rain for baritone, chorus and orchestra, 2001
Concerto for oboe and string orchestra, 2003
New Providence Overture for orchestra, 2003
Concerto for soprano saxophone and string orchestra, 2004
Black River Concerto for violin, percussion and orchestra, 2007

Mixed ensemble

Permit Me Voyage for viola and piano, 1978
Passage for viola and flügelhorn, 1979
Flashback for percussion quartet, 1980
Sonata Forty for horn and piano, 1991
Three Arguments for unaccompanied violoncello, 1993
Dectet for oboe, clarinet, horn, bassoon, piano, two violins, viola, violoncello, and double bass, 1998
Sketches for violin and marimba, 2007
The Powell Trio for tenor trombone, marimba, and piano, 2009
Three Sides for trumpet, vibraphone, and piano, 2009
Just Keep Moving for horn, bass trombone, marimba, and piano, 2010
Undercurrents Redux for flute, clarinet, and piano, 2010
Counterwork for trumpet, marimba, and piano, 2010
Flare for violoncello, marimba and string orchestra, 2012
Death of Macbeth for percussion quintet, 2013
Memories to Keep Awhile for trumpet/flügelhorn, violin, violoncello, and piano, 2014
Skeleton at the Feast for flute, viola, and guitar, 2017

Choral
O Blessed Face for flute, harp, organ, and mixed choir, 1978
Peace for mixed choir a cappella, 1981
Behold How Good and Lovely It Is for mixed choir and organ, 1984
Shout for Joy! for brass quartet, organ, and mixed choir, 1992
Of the Father’s Love Begotten for mixed choir and organ, 1993
Praise! for mixed choir and organ, 1994
Replogle "Amens" for mixed choir, 2010
For the Last Time for viola, piano, and mixed choir, 2016

Choral with orchestra
The War Prayer for six vocal soloists, mixed choir, and chamber orchestra, 1984-5
Jersey Rain for baritone solo, mixed choir, and orchestra, 2001

Songs and song cycles
The Skein for soprano and piano, 1973
The Birthday for soprano, oboe, violoncello, and harp, 1982
Four Scenes and an Epilogue for soprano, string quartet, and harp, 1984
Three Christmas Scenes for flute/piccolo, oboe/English horn, violoncello, piano, and mixed choir, 1987
The Song My Paddle Sings for mixed choir a cappella, 1987
The Figured Wheel for soprano, oboe/English horn, bassoon, and piano, 1988
"Our Father's Road", A Cantata for New Sweden for narrator, soprano, oboe/English horn, violoncello, piano, and percussion, 1989
Voices of Our Youth for flute, viola, violoncello, harp, and mixed choir, 1997
Two Settings of the Serenity Prayer for mixed choir and organ, 2007
To Hold Us for mixed choir and piano, 2008
Like the Risen Grain for mixed choir, brass quintet, timpani, and organ, 2011

Piano
Cuttings, 1980
Without Warning, 1992

Trumpet(s)/flügelhorn

The Mysteries Remain for trumpet and organ, 1978
Passage for viola and flügelhorn, 1979
Litany of Breath for trumpet, 1980
Trumpet Descants on Festive Hymns for trumpet, 1981
Flight for three trumpets, 1982
Winter Ceremony for two trumpets and percussion, 198.
Trumpet Descants on Christmas Hymns for trumpet, 1983
Triptych for trumpet and orchestra, 1991
Solo for unaccompanied flügelhorn, 1991
Serenade for flügelhorn and string orchestra, 1998
Notes from Faraway Places - three suites of concert etudes for one or two trumpets, 2001
Breakaway for two trumpets and digital audio, 2004
Serenade for trumpet and wind ensemble, 2006
Morning Pages for unaccompanied trumpet, 2007
Three Sides for trumpet, vibraphone and piano, 2009
Inamere for 12 trumpets, 2011
Memories to Keep Awhile for trumpet/flügelhorn, violin, violoncello, and piano, 2014
The Wind Came In Red for trumpet and piano, 2015
Double Back for solo trumpet, trombone, and wind ensemble, 2015
Random Acts for trumpet and piano, 2018
In Time for bass trombone, percussion, and piano, 1988

Tuba
Three Portraits for tuba and chamber orchestra, 1990
Emma’s Dance for tuba and piano, 1994
Evensong for tuba and digital audio, 1995
Serenata for tuba and wind ensemble, 2005
Sightline for tuba and piano, 2017

Wind ensemble
Moving Parts for wind ensemble, 2003
Serenata for tuba and wind ensemble, 2005
Serenade for trumpet and wind ensemble, 2006
Outburst for wind ensemble, 2006
Millbrook Suite for wind ensemble, 2008
Legend for wind ensemble, 2011
Future Relics for baritone saxophone, marimba/xylophone, and wind ensemble, 2013
Double Back for solo trumpet, trombone, and wind ensemble, 2015

Brass ensemble
Fanfare for Canterbury Cathedral for double brass quintet, 1978
Points for brass octet and percussion, 1983; rev. 1987
Reflections On a Dance for 14 brass and two percussion, 1988
Westfield Fanfare for 13 brass and three percussion, 1993
Hommage JFK for 14 brass and three percussion, 1995
Edge for 13 brass, snare drum, and timpani, 2008
Changewater Suite for eight trombones, 2008
Crosscurrents for 15 brass and two percussion, 2009
Chants and Flourishes for double brass quintet, 2009
Inamere for twelve trumpets, 2011

Brass quintet
Echoes and Other Ghosts, 1986
Morning Music, 1986
Distant Voices, 1990
Strata, 1999
Entrance/Exit, 2003
A Family Portrait, 2008
Chesapeake, 2010
Smoky Mountain Fanfare, 2010
Still, 2013

Brass trio
Duncan Trio, 1980

Chamber winds
The Endless Instant for clarinet and percussion, 1980
In Memoriam: W.E.S. for woodwind quintet, 1981
Nine Times Mime for oboe, harp, and percussion, 1983
Four Winds for wind quartet, 1991
Short Stories for woodwind quintet, 1994

String orchestra
Serenade for flügelhorn and string orchestra, 1998
Concerto for Dancers and String Orchestra for dancers and string orchestra, 2000
Concerto for soprano saxophone and string orchestra, 2004

Single instrument
Litany of Breath for unaccompanied trumpet, 1980
Solo for unaccompanied flugelhorn, 1991
Notes From Faraway Places for unaccompanied trumpet(s), 2001
Undercurrents for unaccompanied flute, 2007
Morning Pages for unaccompanied trumpet, 2007

String quartet
Elements, 2002
Breathing Lessons, 2006

Concerto
Triptych for trumpet and orchestra, 1991
Turns for violoncello and orchestras, 1994
Serenade for flügelhorn and string orchestra, 1998
Concerto for Dancers and String Orchestra for dancers and string orchestra, 2000
Concerto for oboe and string orchestra, 2003
Concerto for soprano saxophone and string orchestra, 2004
Black River Concerto for violin, percussion, and orchestra, 2007
Future Relics for baritone saxophone, marimba/xylophone, and wind ensemble, 2013
Double Back for trumpet, trombone, and wind ensemble, 2015

References

1951 births
21st-century American composers
21st-century American conductors (music)
21st-century American male musicians
21st-century trumpeters
American classical composers
American classical trumpeters
American contemporary classical composers
American male classical composers
American male conductors (music)
American male trumpeters
Classical musicians from New Jersey
Classical musicians from Virginia
Curtis Institute of Music alumni
Hunter College alumni
Living people
Manhattan School of Music alumni
Musicians from Charlottesville, Virginia